Sahadevan Mahadevan is a 1988 Indian Tamil-language comedy film, directed by Rama Narayanan, starring Mohan and S. V. Shekhar, with S. S. Chandran, Kovai Sarala, Pallavi, and Madhuri in supporting roles.The music was composed by Shankar–Ganesh. This movie is a Tamil remake of Malayalam movie Mazha Peyyunnu Maddalam Kottunnu (1986).

Plot
The story is about two unemployed youths, Sahadevan (Mohan) and Mahadevan (S. V. Shekhar), who become detectives to solve Kaveri's (Madhuri) problem. Kaveri is Sahadevan's love interest. Adiyapatham (S. S. Chandran) is a politician who is going to open a party for children. Adiyapatham is too affectionate with his wife Chinnamani (Kovai Sarala). Mahadevan is an unemployed youth in a village and he ran away from his three daughters of his uncle after he came to Madras (Chennai). He went to Sahadevan's rental house and got into a problem with the house owner (S. N. Parvathy). She took his and Mahadevan's degree certificates for not paying the rent, so both men went to Adiyapatham's place for asking about his car shed rent. He misunderstand that Mahadevan came for a marriage proposal to his daughter Geetha (Pallavi). Geetha falls in love with Mahadevan, but he runs away when he saw her. Sahadevan falls in love with Kaveri, but she has a problem with her maternal uncle Veerappa (Chozharajan), who wants to marry her. So he kidnaps Chinnamani instead of Kaveri, and Chinnamani gives the phone number of the place to Adiyapatham. Both Sahadevan and Mahadevan find the place through the telephone exchange. They go and fight with Veerappa and his people and save Kaveri from them with a final police sequence. The film finishes with the men's marriages.

Cast
 Mohan as Sahadevan
 S. V. Shekhar as Mahadevan
 S. S. Chandran as Politician Adiyapatham
 Kovai Sarala as Chinnamani
 Pallavi as Geetha
 Madhuri as Kaveri
 S. N. Parvathy as Sahadevan's house owner
 Kumarimuthu as Laundry Man
 Thyagu as Miloma Smuggler
 Chozharajan as Veerappa, Kavari's maternal uncle
 Pakoda Kathar as Kumarimuthu's laundry assistant

Songs
The music was composed by Shankar–Ganesh and penned by Vaali.
 "Aayiram Poigal Pesum" Sakthisanmugam
 "Devaloga Indhiran Theendidaatha Chandhiran" Mano and chorus
 "Oru Jigu Jigu Rail" S. P. Balasubrahmanyam and Vani Jayaram
 "Raja Raja Chozhan Thaan" Mano and S. N. Surender
 "Sirikkanum Thaikkulanga Sirikkanum" Seerkazhi Sivachidambaram

References

External links

1988 films
1980s Tamil-language films
Films scored by Shankar–Ganesh
Films directed by Rama Narayanan